Richard Peter Baker (born 29 December 1987) is an English footballer who plays for Northern Premier League Division One West side Ramsbottom, where he plays as a midfielder.

Early career

Manchester United
Richie began his career in the highly successful Manchester United Academy, where he played as a right-back, and was understudy to Danny Simpson, which somewhat restricted Baker to much playing time, he also played alongside the likes of Gerard Piqué, Fraizer Campbell and Giuseppe Rossi, during his time at Old Trafford.

Playing career

Preston North End
Following the decision by Manchester United to release Baker, he joined EFL Championship side Preston North End as a trainee, but failed to make a breakthrough into the first team and was released at the end of the 2005–06 season.

Bury
Baker went to join Bury, and made his full debut in the League Cup victory over Sunderland playing as a central midfielder, and after that game established himself as a first-team regular, scoring six goals in 107 appearances.

Oxford United
Richie joined Oxford United at the start of the 2010–11 season, but failed to win a regular place in the team.

Barrow
He left Oxford United on 4 January 2011 when his contract expired. Baker then signed for Barrow on 15 February 2011, making his debut against Mansfield Town four days later. In May 2011, he was offered a new contract by Barrow. Baker became a major part of the Barrow team for the subsequent two seasons. However, he left when they were relegated in May 2013.

Tamworth
Baker joined Tamworth on 24 May 2013.

Stockport County
Baker signed for Conference North side Stockport County on 3 August 2014, following some impressive displays whilst on trial, in particular scoring a brace in a pre-season friendly against Conference National side Macclesfield Town

AFC Fylde
Baker signed for Conference North side AFC Fylde on 13 March 2015. He made his debut the next day in a 2–2 draw at local rivals Chorley. On 11 May 2017, it was announced that Baker would leave Fylde upon the expiry of his current deal in June 2017.

F.C. United of Manchester
In July 2017, he signed for F.C. United of Manchester. He left the club on 2 September by mutual consent.

Curzon Ashton
On 23 September 2017, he signed for Curzon Ashton

Lancaster City
On 30 June 2018, it was announced that Baker had dropped down a division to sign for Northern Premier League Premier Division side Lancaster City, managed by Phil Brown.

Colne
On 11 December 2018, Baker was announced as signing for Colne. He re-joined the club on 23 June 2019.

Ramsbottom United
On 16 November 2019, he joined Ramsbottom United who were managed by Chris Wilcock. He made 27 appearances for the club over three season.

Clitheroe
In August 2021, he signed for Northern Premier League Division One West rivals Clitheroe, where he teamed up with former Ramsbottom duo Billy Priestley and Gary Stopforth who were joint-managers. Ramsbottom manager, Lee Donafee, stated that Clitheroe "made him an offer he couldn't refuse. Stopforth is a very good friend of his and they offered him a good deal, maybe helping them out with coaching and that which is a real shame for us."

Career statistics

References

External links

Richie Baker Profile at BarrowAFC.com

1987 births
Living people
Footballers from Burnley
English footballers
Association football midfielders
Manchester United F.C. players
Preston North End F.C. players
Bury F.C. players
Oxford United F.C. players
Barrow A.F.C. players
Tamworth F.C. players
Stockport County F.C. players
AFC Fylde players
F.C. United of Manchester players
Curzon Ashton F.C. players
Lancaster City F.C. players
Colne F.C. players
Ramsbottom United F.C. players
Clitheroe F.C. players
English Football League players
National League (English football) players
Northern Premier League players